Edgar dos Passos Pinto (born 18 June 1991), better known as Edgar, is a Brazilian footballer who plays as a right back for Clube Andraus Brasil Ltda.

Career
Plays in the Sociedade Esportiva Palmeiras B.

Career statistics
(Correct )

Contract
 Atlético Paranaense.

See also
Football in Brazil
List of football clubs in Brazil

References

External links
 ogol.com
 soccerway
Edgar at ZeroZero

1991 births
Living people
Brazilian footballers
Club Athletico Paranaense players
Association football defenders
Footballers from São Paulo